The 2014 OFC U-20 Women's Championship was the sixth edition of the OFC U-20 Women's Championship. The continent's association football youth tournament organised by the Oceania Football Confederation. The tournament takes place in Auckland, New Zealand from 18 to 22 February 2014. Four teams take part.

The Championship acts as the continent's qualifying event for the 2014 FIFA U-20 Women's World Cup that will take place Canada later in this year.

Oceania's two top ranked teams New Zealand and Papua New Guinea won their first two games and then played of for the title on the last matchday. New Zealand won 3–0 and qualified to the World Cup.

Participating Teams
Only four of OFC's eleven nations have entered a team. The official draw was held on 24 January at OFC headquarters.

 (Hosts)

Format
The four teams played a round-robin. The winner advanced to the World Cup.

Officials
Nine referees and nine assistant referees were named for the tournament.

Referees
 Uinifareti Aliva 
 Robinson Banga 
 Anna-Marie Keighley
 Tupou Patia
 Finau Vulivuli

Assistant Referees
 Lonisa Dilioni
 Nagarita Jimmy
 Lata Kaumatule 
 Jacqui Stephenson
 Maria Salamasina
 Wanting Yagum

Matches
All times are local, UTC+13:00 (New Zealand Daylight saving time)

Awards
 

Golden Ball (MVP): Meagen Gunemba (PNG)
Golden Boot (Leading Scorer): Emma Rolston (NZL)
Golden Gloves (Best Goalkeeper): Tangimausia Ma’afu (TON)
Fair Play Award: Vanuatu

Goal scorers
4 goals
 Emma Rolston
3 goals
 Martine Puketapu
 Meagen Gunemba
2 goals
 Briar Palmer
 Jasmine Pereira
 Tayla O'Brien
 Malia Tongia
1 goal

 Catherine Bott
 Daisy Cleverley
 Lauren Dabner
 Belinda Van Noorden
 Dinna Awele
 Yvonne Gabong
 Talitha Irakau
 Georgina Kaikas
 Nicola Niaman
 Ilisapeti Malekamu
 Unaloto Tahitu'a

Own goal 
 Daisy Cleverley
 Rumona Morris

References

External links
OFC U-20 Women's Schedule & Results, oceaniafootball.com

2014
2014 in women's association football
2014 Ofc U-20 Women's Championship
2013–14 in OFC football
2013–14 in New Zealand association football
2014 in youth association football